Walk on Water was a Christian music band in Sweden who won a national competition with the video for "What's the Noise?", a song on their first album.

References

Christian musical groups
Musical groups established in 1990